Federal Highway 138 (Carretera Federal 138) is a Federal Highway of Mexico. The highway is a short connector route that links San Bernardino, State of Mexico in the south to Tepexpan, State of Mexico in the north. In spite of being an even-numbered Federal Highway route, the highway is aligned north–south.

References

138